Avantha Group is an Indian business conglomerate. Its businesses include power generation and distribution, power transmission and distribution equipment and services, paper and pulp, farm forestry, and infrastructure.

Divisions
Avantha Group operates in 90 countries with over 25,000 employees worldwide. Business units include:
 Crompton Greaves, (CG) India's largest power transmission and distribution equipment company, listed on the Indian Stock exchanges. CG acquired:
Pauwels (Belgium) in 2005,
Ganz Hungary in 2006, 
Microsol Ireland in 2007,
Sonomatra France in 2008,
MSE Power Systems United States, also in 2008,
Power Technology Solutions UK in 2010
Three business in Nelco India in 2011
Emotron Sweden in 2011
QEI Inc, USA and
ZIV Group, Spain in 2012
Ballarpur Industries (BILT), India's largest paper manufacturer, listed on the Indian Stock exchanges.
BILT acquired Sabah Forest Industries (SFI) of Malaysia in 2007. 
Avantha Power & Infrastructure, a company involved in power generation. On 16 August 2021 the company announced the commencement of insolvency.
Biltech Building Elements, which manufactures lightweight autoclaved aerated concrete (AAC) from fly ash.

See also 
Gautam Thapar

Karam Chand Thapar
L. M. Thapar
Thapar Group

References

External links
 Avantha Group official website
 The Economist article

Multinational companies
Conglomerate companies established in 1919
Companies based in New Delhi
Avantha Group